Bono is an unincorporated community in Lucas County, Ohio, United States.

History
A post office called Bono was established in 1898, and remained in operation until it was discontinued in 1974. The community bears the name of Francis Bunno, chief of the Cherokee.

Notes

Unincorporated communities in Lucas County, Ohio
Unincorporated communities in Ohio